The Sweatbox is a 2002 American documentary film directed by Trudie Styler designed to show behind-the-scenes footage of Kingdom of the Sun (the original version of The Emperor's New Groove). It illustrated the slow and painful transformation from Kingdom of the Sun to The Emperor's New Groove, including director Roger Allers, musician Sting, artists and voice cast being dismayed by the new direction. The film's major theme is creative-executive conflicts.

Synopsis
In 1997, director Roger Allers asks British singer-songwriter Sting to help write the music to a new Disney animated feature titled Kingdom of the Sun. He is intrigued with the project as is the cast and crew who all voice their love over the epic story, the songs and the quirky tone it is taking. The crew then present what they have finished so far to executive producers Thomas Schumacher and Peter Schneider in the titular sweatbox, the room where they screen their half-finished product. However, the producers are harshly dissatisfied and demand that the film be redone, though they underhandedly admit that they liked the "love song" and the "llama song".

Allers and the crew are taken aback as they feel that all of their hard work has been for nothing. They concoct a new plot, though the animators are concerned over the new direction with many worried that their contribution will not make it into the final film. Mark Dindal takes up the directing duties with the title now slightly changed to Kingdom in the Sun. One of the film's stars, Owen Wilson, is replaced with John Goodman and the Prince and the Pauper-style story with magic elements is replaced with a comical farce. This ends up earning the approval of Schneider and Schumacher, though Sting is slightly miffed at the new changes.

Sting continues to work on the film, though he feels that his role has been reduced somewhat. Nevertheless, his complaints about the film's ending (which went against his conservationist beliefs) actually manages to get through to the higher ups who agree with altering the ending slightly. He later discovers that the title has been changed once again to The Emperor's New Groove. While at first indifferent to the title, he warms up to it once he sees a clip from the almost finished product. The documentary ends with Don Hahn admitting that, despite the hard work and disagreements over the project, he is mostly satisfied with how it turned out.

Background
Trudie Styler, a documentarian, had been allowed to film the production of Kingdom of the Sun/The Emperor's New Groove as part of the deal that originally brought her husband Sting to the project. As a result, Styler recorded on film much of the struggle, controversy, and troubles that went into making the picture (including the moment when producer Fullmer called Sting to inform the pop star that his songs were being deleted from the film). Disney owns the rights to the documentary and has not released it on home video or DVD.

The naming is due to the screening room at the Disney studio in Burbank, which when originally set up had "no air conditioning, causing the animators to sweat while their rough work was being critiqued." The "process of reviewing the animation as it developed" became known as the Sweatbox, and as the documentary was about "the process of making an animated film," the term was chosen as the title. This "making of" documentary was co-directed by Styler and John-Paul Davidson.

A review by MotionPictureComics.com explains the plot: While "the first thirty-to-forty minutes of The Sweatbox unfolds as one might expect any in-depth look at the making of an animated film to go"...about forty minutes in, we witness the fateful day in which an early story-boarded cut of the film is screened for the heads of Disney Feature Animation, Thomas Schumacher and Peter Schneider. They hate the film, declare that it is not working, and begin a process of totally scrapping and reinventing huge chunks of the story. Characters are totally changed...voice actors are replaced, and the entire story is shifted around." Dorse A. Lanpher said the film "documents the pain and anguish of the maneuvering to get The Kingdom of the Sun/The Emperor's New Groove made into a movie.

The 95-minute film, which was originally supposed to be released at the beginning of 2001, was instead altered for bonus featurette on New Groove’s DVD release. A Disney-approved version of the film received a worldwide premiere at the Toronto International Film Festival on September 13, 2002. It also had a short run at the Loews Beverly Center Cineplex of Los Angeles "in an unpublicized one-week run in order to be eligible for an Academy Award nomination". In addition to this, the film was also "shown at The Enzian theater in Orlando as part of the Florida Film Festival".

Reception
The film holds a 100% rating on Rotten Tomatoes, based on six reviews.

According to Wade Sampson, staff writer at MousePlanet who attended a screening, each time Tom Schumacher or Peter Schneider (then-Disney Feature Animation president and Disney Studios chairman respectively) were on the screen, "there were howls from the audience that was partly composed of animators from Disney Feature Animation Florida." He says that "the two executives did come across as nerdy bullies who really didn't seem to know what was going on when it came to animation," and that they "were unnecessarily hurtful and full of politically correct speech." He adds that it is left to the viewer to decide if this impression is due to editing or a "remarkable truthful glimpse." Sampson adds, "Rarely have artists been caught so evocatively in fear of executives, or executives portrayed as so clueless as to how to deal with artists, how to resolve story problems and how to understand what audiences wanted." He says that "supporters of Allers' original vision still feel that if he had been given the time, money and support that the film would have been a masterpiece," but "instead of the more ambitious Kingdom of the Sun, the Disney Studio decides to go with a supposedly more commercial film incorporating some of the same characters and location, Emperor's New Groove."

Although the film in its completed form had been kept under wraps for about a decade, on March 21, 2012 it was leaked online by an eighteen-year-old cartoonist in the UK.

After the documentary was leaked online, Amid Amidi of Cartoon Brew gave the following analysis of the film:

Appearances
Mark Dindal
Sting
Roger Allers
Andreas Deja
David Spade
Patrick Warburton
Eartha Kitt
John Goodman
Thomas Schumacher
Roy E. Disney
David Hartley
Randy Fullmer
David Reynolds
Peter Schneider
Don Hahn
Joe Ranft
John Musker
Ron Clements
Gary Trousdale
Kirk Wise	
Dale Baer
Tony Bancroft	
Tom Jones
Owen Wilson
Marc Shaiman
Bruce W. Smith
John Debney
Harvey Fierstein

References

External links

Sweatbox Documentary Unedited Version

2002 films
The Emperor's New Groove
2002 documentary films
Films about Disney
Disney documentary films
Documentary films about animation
Documentary films about films
Films directed by Trudie Styler
Films produced by Trudie Styler
2000s English-language films
2000s American films